Marc Seales is an American jazz pianist associated with post-bop.

As a Professor of Jazz Piano at the University of Washington in Seattle, Seales has worked with Benny Carter, Howard Roberts, Bobby Hutcherson and Art Pepper. His groups include New Stories and the Marc Seales Quartet. Seales won the Earshot Jazz Golden Ear Award for Best Instrumentalist in 1999.

An excerpt of his song 'Highway Blues', was included by default in Windows XP, along with Beethoven's 9th Symphony and David Byrne's "Like Humans Do".

Discography

With New Stories
 Circled By Hounds (self-released, 1995)
 Get Happy (Origin, 1996) - with Don Lanphere, Pete Christlieb
 Remember Why (Origin, 1997)
 Speakin' Out (Origin, 1999-2000) - special guest: Ernie Watts
 Home At Last (Origin, 2001) - with Don Lanphere
 Still Life (Origin, 2001) - with Lynn Bush
 Where Do You Start (Origin, 2002) - with Don Lanphere
 Art Of The Groove (Origin, 2003) - with Brent Jensen, Rob Walker
 Hope Is In The Air: The Music Of Elmo Hope (Origin, 2004)

With Franklin, Seales, Clover
 Two Worlds (A Records/Challenge, 1998)
 Three Worlds (Beezwax, 2000)
 Ears Wide Open (Beezwax, 2001)
 Colemanology (Beezwax, 2004)
 Summer Serenade (Beezwax, 2005)

Marc Seales / Marc Seales Band
 A Time, A Place, A Journey [live] (Origin, 2004)
 The Paris Suite (self-released, 2008)
 American Songs, Volume 1 (self-released, 2010)
 American Songs, Volume 2: Blues...And Jazz (Origin, 2012 [rel. 2014])
 American Songs, Volume 3: Place & Time (Origin, 2012 [rel. 2015])

References

External links
 [ Marc Seales] on Allmusic
 Article about Seales at Origin Arts
 Faculty Profile at University of Washington

American jazz pianists
American male pianists
Musicians from Washington (state)
University of Washington faculty
Year of birth missing (living people)
Living people
African-American pianists
Microsoft Windows sample music
21st-century American pianists
21st-century American male musicians
American male jazz musicians
Origin Records artists
20th-century American pianists
20th-century American male musicians
20th-century African-American musicians
21st-century African-American musicians